The electoral district of Narracan is an electoral district of the Victorian Legislative Assembly in Australia. It was first proclaimed in 1967 and has usually been held by the Liberal Party.

The electorate covers the provincial Warragul–Drouin urban area, as well as many smaller rural towns in north west Gippsland.

The electoral district of Narracan is named after Narracan, a rural locality located in the narrow Narracan Creek Valley, 14km south of Moe. The word "narracan" is believed to be derived from an Aboriginal word describing a crow.

Members for Narracan

Election results

References

External links
 Electorate profile: Narracan District, Victorian Electoral Commission

Electoral districts of Victoria (Australia)
1967 establishments in Australia
Shire of Baw Baw
Shire of Cardinia